Ahmed Izzet Pasha (1864 – 31 March 1937), known as Ahmet İzzet Furgaç after the Turkish Surname Law of 1934, was an Ottoman general during World War I. He was also one of the last Grand Viziers of the Ottoman Empire (14 October 1918 - 8 November 1918) and its last Minister of Foreign Affairs.

Biography

He was born in Nasliç, Manastir Vilayet, into an Albanian family. His father was a prominent civil servant of the area. From 1887 to 1890 he was educated in strategy and military geography in the Ottoman Military College, while later until 1894 he studied in Germany under Colmar Freiherr von der Goltz. As a result of his participation in the Greco-Turkish War he was promoted to the rank of Miralay (colonel). In 1908 after the Young Turk Revolution he became chief of the Ottoman general staff. During that period ( under the Young Turk Government) he was opposed to the military actions of the Ottoman army under Mahmud Shevket Pasha against Albanian nationalists during the Albanian revolts of 1910. His strong opposal to Mahmud Pasha's policies led to his dismissal and reappointment in Yemen in February 1911.

In 1916, he was appointed commander of the Second Army which fought in the Caucasus alongside the Third Army. In 1917, he was appointed to command the Anatolian group of armies, which comprised the Second and Third Armies. The highest rank he held was that of marshal.

After the war, and with the support from Mustafa Kemal Pasha, he was called upon to lead the government that signed the Armistice of Mudros on behalf of the Ottoman Empire, thus putting an end to the First World War for the Ottomans. He also served concurrently as the Minister of Foreign Affairs during his premiership. He was dismissed on 8 November 1918. Afterwards, he was criticized for allowing all three of the Three Pashas to escape abroad on the night of 2–3 November before they could be put on trial in the Turkish Courts-Martial of 1919–20 for crimes including atrocities against the Armenians of the Empire. Ahmed Izet Pasha spent much of his 25 days in premiership bedridden after catching the 1918 Spanish flu.

After the dissolution of the Ottoman Empire and the subsequent loss of the title of pasha after the establishment of the Republic of Turkey, Ahmed Izzet adopted the surname Furgaç in 1934. He died on 31 March 1937 in Istanbul.

Ahmed Izzet Pasha's decisions during the Caucasus Campaign have also been criticized and are regarded as one of the factors of its failure, while his subsequent high reputation in Turkey has been attributed to his successful activity during the Turkish War of Independence.

See also
 İzzet Pasha government
 Armistice of Mudros

References

External links

 

1864 births
1937 deaths
People from Manastir vilayet
Ottoman Military Academy alumni
Ottoman Military College alumni
20th-century Grand Viziers of the Ottoman Empire
Field marshals of the Ottoman Empire
Ottoman military personnel of the Balkan Wars
Ottoman military personnel of World War I
Albanian Grand Viziers of the Ottoman Empire
Turkish people of Albanian descent
Albanians from the Ottoman Empire
Albanian Pashas
Albanians in North Macedonia
Albanian military personnel
Ministers of Foreign Affairs of the Ottoman Empire
Grand Crosses of the Order of Vasa